The Shakva is a river in Perm Krai, Russia, a right tributary of the Sylva. It flows through the Beryozovsky and Kungursky districts of the krai and into the Sylva near the town of Kungur. The main tributaries are the Kultym and Bartym rivers (left), and the Sova and Saya rivers (right).

References 

Rivers of Perm Krai